Tsarasaotra is the name of several municipalities in Madagascar;

 Tsarasaotra, in the region of Amoron'i Mania
 Tsarasaotra, Anjozorobe, in the region of Analamanga.
 Tsarasaotra Park - a privately run lake and bird's park in Antananarivo